The 1987 Coupe de France Final was a football match held at Parc des Princes, Paris on 10 June 1987, that saw FC Girondins de Bordeaux defeat Olympique de Marseille 2–0 thanks to goals by Philippe Fargeon and Zlatko Vujovic.

Match details

See also
Coupe de France 1986–87

External links
Coupe de France results at Rec.Sport.Soccer Statistics Foundation
Report on French federation site

Coupe
1987
Coupe De France Final 1987
Coupe De France Final 1987
Coupe De France Final
Coupe De France Final